Nothing But Your Love is the tenth studio album of Japanese singer, Toshinobu Kubota (credited under Toshi Kubota), released on June 28, 2000.

Background
On June 21, 2000, Kubota released the single "Nothing But Your Love" which charted at number 97. In March 2001, "Masquerade" was released as the second single. In the same year, Kubota began the "Nothing But As One Tour". The album reached number 7 on the Oricon Albums chart and remained on the chart for a total of four weeks. It is also noted that this is Kubota's second English-language album.

Track listing
 "Nothing But Your Love" (Toshi Kubota)
 "Masquerade" (Toshi Kubota, Mercedes Martinez, Tracey Moore)
 "Never Turn Back" (featuring Pras) (Toshi Kubota, Joi Cardwell, Luigi Creatore, Hugo Peretti, George David Weiss)
 "Body Bounce" (Toshi Kubota, Joi Cardwell, Roger Troutman)
 "Someday" (Toshi Kubota, Angie Stone)
 "Till She Comes" (Toshi Kubota, Mercedes Martinez, Tracey Moore)
 "Pu Pu" (Raphael Saadiq, Angie Stone, Toshi Kubota)
 "Nothing But Your Love" (Interlude) (Toshi Kubota)
 "Sha-Ba-Da-Bu-Doo" (Go With The Flow) (Camus Celli Mix) (Toshi Kubota, Joi Cardwell, Williams, Nichols)
 "Shame" (Raphael Saadiq, Angie Stone, Toshi Kubota)
I Just Can't Get Enough" (Toshi Kubota, Joi Cardwell, Philip White, Carsten Schack, Kenneth Karlin)
 "It's Over" (featuring Punchline & Wordsworth) (Jean-Claude Olivier, Samuel Barnes, Charmelle Cofield)
 "Gently" (Diane Warren)

Personnel
Art Direction: Ian Cuttler
Bass: Leonard Hubbard, Carl James
Drums: Ralph Rolle
Drum Programming: Camus Mare Celli, Soulshock
Editing: Bill Malina
Engineer: Camus Mare Celli, Jason Goldstein, Chaz Harper, Dave Ivory, Manny Marroquin, James Murray, Joe Nicolo, Dave O'Donnell, Jon Smeltz
Engineer [Assistant]: Jim Caruana, Victor McCoy
Keyboards: Jeff Bova, Camus Mare Celli, Soulshock, Bette Sussman
Mastering: Vladimir Meller
Mixing: Camus Mare Celli, Ben Garrison, Manny Marroquin, Joe Nicolo, Axel Niehaus, Dexter Simmons
String Arrangements: Jeff Bova
Synthesizer: Jeff Bova
Turntables: Steve D.

References

2000 albums
Toshinobu Kubota albums
Sony Music albums